This is a list of the people born in, residents of, or otherwise closely associated with the city of Des Moines, Iowa, and its surrounding metropolitan area.

Entertainers

Steve Higgins, producer, actor, comedian, writer, and announcer of The Tonight Show Starring Jimmy Fallon
S. Torriano Berry, film producer, writer, and director
Bruce Brubaker, pianist and Juilliard School faculty member
Bill Bryson, author
Dorothy Byrne, opera singer
Claiborne Cary, actress
Virginia Christine, actress, Mrs. Olson in over 100 commercials for Folgers Coffee; attended Elmwood Elementary School in Des Moines
Stephen Collins, actor, 7th Heaven
Bill Daily, actor, best known as Capt. Roger Healey on I Dream of Jeannie, and Howard Borden on The Bob Newhart Show
Jay Norwood "Ding" Darling, editorial cartoonist, received the 1924 and 1943 Pulitzer Prize for Editorial Cartooning
Sarah Darling, country music singer-songwriter
Nicholas Downs, actor
Logan Disbrow, soccer player, graphic designer, computer programmer
Rusty Draper, singer
Ben Easter, actor and photographer
Hope Emerson, actress
Cyrus Fees, mixed martial arts/pro wrestling TV announcer
Roy Halston Frowick, fashion designer who rose to international fame in the 1970s
Gordon Gebert, actor
Juanita Hansen, silent film actress and anti-drug spokeswoman
Peter Hedges, writer of What's Eating Gilbert Grape; director of film Pieces of April
Alan J. Higgins, producer and writer for television
David Anthony Higgins, actor, Malcolm in the Middle
Harriet Hilliard, film and TV actress, singer, The Adventures of Ozzie and Harriet, Ozzie Nelson and His Orchestra
Frank Jenks, actor
Cloris Leachman, 1971 Academy Award in The Last Picture Show, Golden Globe in 1976 for Best Lead Actress in a Comedy Series as Phyllis Lindstrom in Phyllis, one Daytime Emmy and eight Primetime Emmy Award-winning actress and, as of 2016, the record for most wins by a performer; inducted into the Television Academy Hall of Fame in 2011; participant in Miss America
Phyllis Love, actress
Marilyn Maye, singer and musical actress
Maryhelen Mayfield, ballet dancer and arts administrator
Charles McGraw, actor
Frank Miller, editorial cartoonist, received the 1963 Pulitzer Prize for Editorial Cartooning for his notable editorial cartoon on nuclear warfare
Jason Momoa, actor best known as Khal Drogo in Game of Thrones, and as Aquaman in DC Comics' upcoming superhero film Justice League, other work Baywatch Hawaii, Stargate, New Conan the Barbarian
Conrad Nagel, silent film actor and a founder of the Academy of Motion Picture Arts and Sciences (AMPAS); hosted the 3rd and 5th Academy Awards and co hosted with Bob Hope the 25th Academy Awards
Vivienne Osborne, stage and film actress
B. J. Palmer, once an owner of the radio station WHO in Des Moines, the person who hired Ronald Reagan as a sports broadcaster at WOC radio which he also owned
Chris Pirillo, television personality and technology figure
Ronald Reagan, actor and President of the United States, was a radio sports announcer in Des Moines
Brandon Routh, actor, best known for title role in Superman Returns
Martin Spellman, actor
Bill Stewart,  jazz drummer, worked with Pat Metheny
Stephen Stucker, actor, best known for role as air traffic controller in 1980 movie Airplane!
India Summer, adult film actress
Tionne "T-Boz" Watkins of TLC, Grammy-winning R&B singer
Tiny Tim, ukulele musician, performed at Monterey Pop Festival and frequently opened for The Doors at The Scene with Jimi Hendrix in the audience
Gregory Alan Williams, actor
Andy Williams, singer
Roger Williams, pianist and recording artist
Wally Wingert, voice actor and radio personality
Dante Powell, stand-up comedian

Sports

Michael Annett, NASCAR Sprint Cup Series driver for JR Motorsports
Chris Ash, since 2016 season, Rutgers football head coach; played and coached at Drake University
Rob Ash, longtime Drake University head football coach, ranks in the Top 20 for wins among active college football coaches through the 2015 season
Harrison Barnes, NBA player
Steve Bartkowski, NFL quarterback
William Bell Jr., Negro league baseball player
Casey Blake, Major League Baseball (MLB) player
Matt Bullard, NBA player; a color commentator for Houston Rockets telecasts
Liang Chow, Olympic gymnastics coach of Shawn Johnson in 2008 Olympics and Gabby Douglas in 2012 Olympics
Scott Clemmensen, NHL hockey player
Gabby Douglas, first African American or first of African descent of any nationality in Olympic history to be individual all-around champion; member of United States women's national gymnastics team at 2012 Summer Olympics, where she won gold medals in individual all-around and team competitions; also member of gold-winning team at 2011 and 2015 World Championships; at 2016 Summer Olympics she won gold in team competition, becoming first U.S. gymnast to win gold in both individual all-around and team competitions at same Olympics. She trained full-time with coach Liang Chow at Chow's gym in West Des Moines.
Harold Ely, NFL player
Joel Hanrahan, pitcher for Boston Red Sox
Bobby Hansen, NBA player, played for Dowling Catholic High School in West Des Moines, and University of Iowa
Bob Harlan, CEO of Green Bay Packers 1989-2007
Rex Harvey, Team USA decathlete, one of the developers of tables for grading athletic performances based on sex and age
Jeremy Hellickson, pitcher for Washington Nationals, attended Herbert Hoover High School in Des Moines
Ducky Holmes, early 20th Century baseball player
Frank Irons, 1908 Olympic long jump gold medalist
Kip Janvrin, Olympian, the oldest United States decathlete to ever compete in the Olympics
Shawn Johnson, gymnast, 2007 individual all-around World Champion, 2007 national all-around champion, 2008 Olympic champion in balance beam and team, all-around and floor exercise silver medalist; Johnson and Gabby Douglas were Liang Chow's students at his gymnastics school in West Des Moines. winner of Season 8 Dancing with the Stars
Zach Johnson, golfer, winner of 2007 Masters Tournament and 2015 The Open Championship, attended college at Drake University in Des Moines
Lolo Jones, Olympic track-and-field and bobsled athlete
Nile Kinnick, football player and 1939 Heisman Trophy recipient
Miranda Leek, Olympic athlete in archery; competed as both individual and team
Kevin Love, NASCAR driver
Matt Macri, third baseman, played at Dowling Catholic High School in West Des Moines
George Mason, Indianapolis 500 driver; as an ambulance driver, killed in action during World War I
Kyle Orton, NFL quarterback
Carl Pohlad, financier and former owner of Minnesota Twins
Dick Pope, Sr., the "Father of American Water Skiing" and promoter of Florida tourism; born in Des Moines
Dolph Pulliam, the first African-American television broadcaster in the state of Iowa: the leader and standout player of the Drake men's basketball team in the 1969 Final Four which finished in third-place
Shawna Robinson, NASCAR driver
Buck Shaw, offensive tackle who blocked for George Gipp on Knute Rockne's first undefeated University of Notre Dame football team, winner of two Sugar Bowls as Head Coach of Santa Clara University, the first football head coach at the United States Air Force Academy, the Philadelphia Eagles head coach who won 1960 NFL Championship, and the only coach to have beaten Vince Lombardi in the playoffs.
Matt Snider, NFL player
Jeremy Stephens, featherweight mixed martial arts fighter for UFC
Lester Stoefen, tennis player, U.S. Open doubles champion
Kevin Tapani, Major League Baseball pitcher
Ross Verba, NFL lineman, played for Dowling Catholic High School in West Des Moines
Frank Wykoff, sprinter, gold medalist at 1928, 1932 and 1936 Olympics

Authors

Inez Asher, author and screenwriter
Stephen Beachy, author
David W. Belin, author
Rob Borsellino, author
Bill Bryson, author
Thomas M. Disch, author
Christopher Largen, author
Era Bell Thompson, writer and journalist
Brian Wansink, author of Mindless Eating

Other

James Allen, commander of Fort Des Moines No. 2 (1843-1846) and organizer of the Mormon Battalion, first officer buried at Fort Leavenworth National Cemetery
Frank Mills Andrews, architect
Herbert W. Armstrong, religious evangelist, founder of the Worldwide Church of God
George Ball, diplomat
Joseph Stillman Blake, architect
Martin Bucksbaum, financier and shopping center developer, brother of Maurice and Matthew
Edwin H. Conger, United States Ambassador to China during the Boxer Rebellion, United States Ambassador to Brazil, and United States Ambassador to Mexico
Frances L. Dawson, Illinois state representative and educator
Lawrence Russell Dewey, U.S. Army general
Andreas Dombret, board member German central bank Deutsche Bundesbank civil rights activist
Johnny Gosch, a missing boy
Tyler Howe, mayor
Mike Hammond, along with Ted Waitt are billionaires and co-founders of Gateway Computers
Herman Hollis, one of three FBI special agents who shot John Dillinger outside the Biograph Theater on July 22, 1934, resulting in Dillinger's death; the other special agents were Charles B. Winstead and Clarence O. Hurt
Pauline Brown Humphrey, cosmetologist
Jim Inhofe, former U.S. Senator serving Oklahoma
Stephen Kline, artist, photographer
George Kinley, businessman and Iowa state legislator
Laurence W. Lane Jr., magazine publisher and diplomat
The McCaughey septuplets, born in 1997 in Des Moines to parents from nearby Carlisle, and the world's first set of septuplets to all survive infancy
James Redfield, railroad engineer and surveyor for the Union Armies of Ulysses S. Grant and William Tecumseh Sherman
Ben Silbermann, co-founder and CEO of Pinterest
S.S. Still, graduate of Drake University Law School and founder of what is currently the Des Moines University
John E. Tapscott, businessman and Iowa state legislator
William Tubby, architect
Henry A. Wallace, 33rd Vice President of the United States (1941–45), Secretary of Agriculture (1933–40), and Secretary of Commerce (1945–46)
Henry Cantwell Wallace, editor of Wallaces' Farmer (1916–21) and Secretary of Agriculture (1921–24)
George W. Webber, president of New York Theological Seminary
Larry Zox, Abstract Expressionist, Color Field painter, and Lyrical Abstractionist, Roosevelt High graduate, studied at Des Moines Art Center

Bands

Seven of the nine members of the band Slipknot were born in Des Moines. Paul Gray was born in Los Angeles and James Root was born in Las Vegas.
Corey Taylor, rock/metal musician, vocalist; also with Stone Sour
Sid Wilson, DJ aka DJ Starscream
Joey Jordison, drummer
Chris Fehn, percussionist, backup vocals
Paul Gray, bassist
Craig Jones, keyboardist/sampler
James Root, guitar; and ex guitar player, Stone Sour
Shawn "Clown" Crahan, percussionist
Mick Thomson, guitarist
Donnie Steele, guitarist
The metal band Stone Sour began their music career in Des Moines. Both Slipknot and Stone Sour feature vocalist Corey Taylor:
Faculty Lounge, band made up of former and current Des Moines-area educators, coaches, and/or administrators, is based in Des Moines.
The Nadas, band that Playboy magazine called the "Best College Band You've Never Heard Of" is based in Des Moines.
Jim Roth, guitarist with rock band Built to Spill, is from West Des Moines.
Country singers Kate and Kacey Coppola were born in Des Moines, and appeared on CMT's Can You Duet.

See also

References

 
Des Moines
Des Moines, Iowa